High Kick! (lit. "High Kick without Hesitation" or "Unstoppable High Kick") was a South Korean situation comedy revolving around the life of the Lee family. It aired in South Korea from Monday through Friday, in sitcom format.

The show led to the sequels High Kick Through the Roof, which aired in 2009-2010, and High Kick: Revenge of the Short Legged, which aired in 2011-2012.

Characters
There's a fact that almost all of the character's name is their actor/actress real name - some of the characters just change their last name.

Main
 Lee Soon-jae as Lee Soon-jae, the head of the Lee family, who works alongside his daughter-in-law at his Korean medicine hospital. The oldest in the family, he can be strict and aggressive toward his family members, and thinks only about himself. In flashback scene, He used to be Moon-hee's master 
Lee Tae-ri as young Lee Soon-jae
 Na Moon-hee as Na Moon-hee, Soon-jae's wife. She does all of the cooking and cleaning, and looks after Joon (Min-yong's baby). In flashback scene, she used to serve Sunjae's family as maid
 Jeong Jun-ha as Lee Jun-ha, son of Soon-jae and Moon-hee, a huge man with an enormous appetite. Laid off from his job, he spends his time at home as an unsuccessful investor and depends on the earnings of his wife, who is the main doctor at his father's hospital.
 Choi Min-yong as Lee Min-yong, the late-born son of Soon-jae and Moon-hee, who works as a P.E teacher at Pungpa High School where his nephews attend. Returning to his parents house after a short-lived marriage with Shin Ji, he lives in an expanded and modified storeroom upstairs, which is connected with the main house with a firemen's pole.
 Park Hae-mi as Park Hae-mi, the wife of Lee Joon-ha, she is a doctor that works with Lee Soon-jae. in flashback, she married Lee Junha to seek revenge after her breakup to his boyfriend 
 Kim Hye-seong as Lee Min-ho, the eldest and smart son of Lee Joon-ha and Park Hae-mi.
 Jung Il-woo as Lee Yoon-ho, the youngest son of Lee Joon-ha and Park Hae-mi, who narrates the story of the show.
 Shin Ji as Shin Ji a.k.a. Shin Bong-hee,an unemployed small-time singer. Lee Min-yong's former wife and the mother of Joon who wants to study Music in Russia but was conned. She and Hae-mi are not in good terms. 
 Seo Min-jung as Seo Min-jung, a clumsy English teacher at Pungpa High School, and the homeroom teacher of Min-ho, Yoon-ho, Bum, Chan-sung and Seung-hyun. She rented the apartment that Min-yong and Shin Ji used to live in, and lives there with Shin Ji after her return from the short and unsuccessful attempt to study in Moscow.
 Kim Bum as Kim Bum, Lee Min-ho's best friend, who desires to become a member of the family.
 Park Min-young as Kang Yoo-mi,an unintelligent girlfriend of Lee Min-Ho daughter of Hae-mi's friend.

Minor
 Lee Su-na as Lee Su-na a.k.a. Gaeseong-daek and Lee Yu-na, Na Moon-hee's best friend, currently in prison for murdering her sister.
 Yeom Seung-hyun as Yeom Seung-hyun, another classmate of Min-ho and Yoon-ho, and the rival of Yoon-ho.
 Hwang Chan-sung as Hwang Chan-sung, Yum Seung-hyun's friend and one of Yoon-ho's rivals. He later befriends Yunho. 
 Go Chae-min as Lee Jun, Min-yong and Shin Ji's infant child.
 Na Hye-mi as Na Hye-mi, a classmate of Yoo-mi, transferred from a different school in later episodes.
 Jeong Shin-woo as Nurse Yu
 Park Seung-chan as Nurse Park
 Hong Sun-chang as Hong Sun-chang, the sarcastic Vice Principal of Pungpa High School.
 Yoon Seo-hyun as Lee Seo-hyun, a detective.
 Roh Joo-hyun as Seo Joo-hyun, Seo Min-jung's father.
 Seo Hyun as Han Young-min, a member of the staff in a musical Shin Ji played in.
 Jo Yeon-hee as Yoga instructor
Clara Lee as Kim Yoon-joo (ep. 64)
 Park Chanyeol as High school student (ep. 71)
 Jo Young-min as Yoon-ho
 Kim Hee-jung as Min-ho's crush (ep. 164)

Notes

Original soundtrack
Part 1
 Unstoppable High Kick - Moogadang
 Love U Like U - Moogadang
 Why Is It - Moogadang
 Sambuja Song - Moogadang

Part 2
 Love to Ride - Lee Gyeong-mi
 In Place - Lee Eun-ju

Special edition
 Love to Ride (Full Ver) - Lee Gyeong-mi

International broadcast
 It aired in Japan on cable channel KNTV from May 21, 2007 to January 8, 2008.
 It aired in Vietnam on HTV3 called Gia đình là số 1 from November 11, 2009.
 It aired in the Philippines on TV5 beginning April 5, 2010. Chicosci song Diamond Shotgun was used as the theme song of the series.

Adaptation
 In Vietnam, the series was adapted by Điền Quân Media & Entertainment to be produced in 2016. The first episode was on air on every Monday through Thursday, beginning from January 18, 2017.

References

External links 
 High Kick! official MBC website 
 High Kick! at MBC Global Media
 
 

MBC TV television dramas
South Korean television sitcoms
2006 South Korean television series debuts
2007 South Korean television series endings
Korean-language television shows
South Korean romance television series
South Korean comedy television series
Television series by Chorokbaem Media